Anna Turner may refer to:

 Anna Turner (producer) (1944–1996), U.S. partner of the Hearts of Space radio show and record label
 Anna Turner, High Sheriff of Shropshire, 2009–2010 and Lord Lieutenant of Shropshire since 2019
 Anna Turner, co-owner with Roy Turner of Australian private island resort Haggerston Island
 Sheriff Anna Turner, a character in the TV series The Dead Zone, played by Cara Buono

See also
 Ann Turner (disambiguation)
 Anne Turner (disambiguation)